Bartolini, Gioseffo Maria (1657–1725) was an Italian painter of the late-Baroque period.

He was born at Imola. He painted a Miracle of St. Biagio and other works for the church of San Domenico and in other churches. He opened a school at Imola, and painted throughout Emilia-Romagna. He painted in the style of his first teacher, Lorenzo Pasinelli.

References

1657 births
1725 deaths
People from Imola
17th-century Italian painters
Italian male painters
18th-century Italian painters
Italian Baroque painters
Painters from Bologna
18th-century Italian male artists